Michał Efir (born 14 April 1992) is a Polish former footballer who played as a forward.

Career
Efir started his career with Legia Warsaw.

References

External links
 
 

1992 births
Living people
Sportspeople from Lublin
Polish footballers
Association football forwards
Ekstraklasa players
I liga players
Legia Warsaw players
Ruch Chorzów players
Chełmianka Chełm players
Bytovia Bytów players
Bałtyk Gdynia players